Elmendorf is a city in Bexar County, Texas, United States. It is part of the San Antonio—New Braunfels metropolitan statistical area. Its population was 1,862 at the 2020 census. It was founded in 1885, and named after Henry Elmendorf, a former mayor of San Antonio, and a German-Texan. For a long time, the biggest employer was Star Clay Products.

Geography 
A small portion of Elmendorf extends to the southeast into Wilson County.

Demographics 

As of the 2020 United States census, there were 1,862 people, 451 households, and 374 families residing in the city.

As of the census of 2000,  664 people, 226 households, and 162 families were living in the city. The population density was 537.4 people per sq mi (206.8/km2). The 266 housing units averaged 215.3/sq mi (82.8/km2). The racial makeup of the city was 65.81% White, 0.75% African American, 1.05% Native American, 0.15% Asian, 28.46% from other races, and 3.77% from two or more races. Hispanics or Latinos of any race were 74.10% of the population.

Of the 226 households, 36.3% had children under the age of 18 living with them, 51.3% were married couples living together, 13.3% had a female householder with no husband present, and 27.9% were not families. About 24.3% of all households were made up of individuals, and 8.8% had someone living alone who was 65 years of age or older. The average household size was 2.93, and the average family size was 3.56.

In the city, the age distribution was  30.7% under  18, 8.6% from 18 to 24, 28.6% from 25 to 44, 22.0% from 45 to 64, and 10.1% who were 65  or older. The median age was 34 years. For every 100 females, there were 93.6 males. For every 100 females age 18 and over, there were 96.6 males.

Males had a median income of $27,109 versus $19,583 for females. The per capita income for the city was $12,316. About 24.1% of families and 30.2% of the population were below the poverty line, including 39.6% of those under age 18 and 30.4% of those age 65 or over.

See also 
 Elmendorf Beast
 Maria L. de Hernández – (July 29, 1896 – January 8, 1986), a Mexican-American rights activist, is buried in this town.
 Joseph D. Ball – (January 7, 1896 – September 24, 1938) is a serial killer suspected of killing up to 20 people in Elmendorf.

References 

Cities in Bexar County, Texas
Cities in Texas
Populated places established in 1885
Greater San Antonio